Encyclia candollei is a species of epiphytic orchid of yellow-brown to reddish flowers, native to Belize, Guatemala and Mexico.

Description
The orchid species is a medium-sized, cool growing, epiphytic species. It has clustered, ovoid-conical to globose pseudobulbs enveloped basally by several scarious, sheaths and 1 to 3, coriaceous, elliptic
-ligulate leaves. It blooms in the later spring and summer on a terminal 3 foot [to 90 cm] long, many flowered panicle arising on a mature pseudobulb with several short branches and carrying 2 to 8, weakly fragrant flowers.

The flowers have sepals and petals that are yellow-brown to chocolate and a lip that is cream-colored with fine red-violet veins. The flowers are displayed high above the leaves and have a mild fragrance.

Distribution and habitat
Encyclia candollei is a cool growing epiphyte usually growing on oaks in mountainous forests at elevations of 500 to 1500 meters. Their habitat is situated in Belize, Guatemala and Mexico.

Gallery

References

External links
 
 
 Kew
 Orchidroots.org
 OrchidSpecies.com

candollei
Flora of Central America
Flora of North America
Flora of Belize
Flora of Guatemala
Flora of Mexico
Orchids of Central America
Orchids of North America
Orchids of Belize
Orchids of Guatemala
Orchids of Mexico
Plants described in 1839